The Saihriem (Faihriem, Syriem) language is spoken by a mixture of the Saihriem/Faihriem people- a sub tribe of Hmar group of tribes of the Chin-Kuki-Mizo and other ethnically closely related people such as the Aimol, Kuki, Vaiphei, in four neighbouring villages (Noxatilla, Bagbahar, Balisor, Nagathol & Saihriemkhuo villages) around Dwarbond in Bojalenga Block of Cachar District, Assam.

It is critically endangered, with the people who still speak the language numbering a few hundreds only. It was recorded wrongly as Sairang in the Census of India, 1901 and there were mere 71 speakers of the language at that time. It belongs to the Kuki-Chin branch of the Tibeto-Burman family of languages.

Basic vocabulary

Numbers

Names of weeks

References 

1999, Robin D. Tribhuwan, Preeti R. Tribhuwan, Tribal dances of India ( Encyclopaedic profile of Indian tribes, volume 1), page 117: […] 21 clans. They are Biete, Changsan, Chawrai, Darngawn, Faihriem, […] and Zote. The past tradition suggests that each clan had a dialect of its own but nowadays a common dialect used by the Hmar people was developed by Christian missionaries

1902, B.C. Allen, B.A., I.C.S., Census of India, 1901. Volume IV. Assam. Part I. Report. Print. Chapter VIII, page 90. 

Kuki-Chin languages
Languages of Assam
Endangered languages of India